The 2016 Central Connecticut Blue Devils football team represented Central Connecticut State University in the 2016 NCAA Division I FCS football season. The team was led by third-year head coach Pete Rossomando and played their home games at Arute Field. They were a member of the Northeast Conference. They finished with a record of 2–9, 1–5 in NEC play, to finish in a three-way tie for fifth place.

Schedule

Game summaries

Lafayette

at James Madison

Bowie State

at Bryant

at Penn

Wagner

at Coastal Carolina

at Robert Morris

Sacred Heart

at Saint Francis (PA)

Duquesne

References

Central Connecticut
Central Connecticut Blue Devils football seasons
Central Connecticut Blue Devils football